Airdrie-East is a provincial electoral district in Alberta, Canada. The district is one of 87 districts mandated to return a single member (MLA) to the Legislative Assembly of Alberta using the first past the post method of voting. It was contested for the first time in the 2019 Alberta election.

Geography
The district is located northeast of Calgary, containing most of Airdrie, except the area west of 8 St SW and south of 1 Ave NW. It stretches west past Keoma to RR253.

History

The district was created in 2017 when the Electoral Boundaries Commission recommended abolishing Airdrie and Chestermere-Rocky View, completely reorganizing the ridings surrounding Calgary to reflect the rapid growth in the area. In 2017, the Airdrie-East electoral district had a population of 49,978, which was 7 per cent above the provincial average of 46,803 for a provincial electoral district.

In the 2019 Alberta general election, United Conservative Party candidate and incumbent from the former Airdrie electoral district, Angela Pitt was elected with 67 per cent of the vote, defeating New Democratic Party candidate Roxie Baez Zamora with 20 per cent of the vote, and four candidates.

Electoral results

2010s

References

Alberta provincial electoral districts
Airdrie, Alberta